This is a list of universities and higher education institutions in Oman.

 Sultan Qaboos University
 Middle East College
 Dhofar University
 University of Nizwa
 ASharqiyah University
National University of Science and Technology
 Muscat University (MU)
 Arab Open University
 Muscat University

Oman Tourism College
 College of Banking and Financial Studies
 Global College of Engineering & Technology
 Al Musanna College of Technology
 Alburaimi University College
 Colleges of Applied Sciences at Rustaq, Nizwa, Ibri, Sohar, Sur, Salalah
 Fire Safety Engineering College
 German University of Technology in Oman (GUtech)
 Gulf College
 Higher College of Technology, Al Khuwair
 Majan College (University College)
 Mazoon College
 Modern College of Business and Science
 Muscat University College
 Nizwa College of Technology
 Oman College of Management and Technology
 Oman Medical College "part of National University"
 Royal Guard of Oman Technical College
 Scientific College of Design
 Sohar University
 Sur University College
 University of Buraimi
 Waljat College of Applied Sciences - BITS, Oman
 International Maritime College, Sohar Oman
 Shinas College of Technology, Shinas Oman
 Salalah College of Technology, Salalah Oman

External links
 https://universityimages.com/list-of-universities-in-oman/

Universities
Oman

Oman